Arian Keon Clark (born April 16, 1975) is an American former basketball player in the National Basketball Association (NBA).

Playing career
After a collegiate career at two different junior colleges and UNLV, Clark was selected 13th overall by the Orlando Magic in the 1998 NBA draft but was traded to the Denver Nuggets. He began his professional career with Denver where he enjoyed a stable first three years in the NBA, improving steadily. Clark would go on to play for the Toronto Raptors, Sacramento Kings, and Utah Jazz. With the Jazz, he only played two games before being traded to the Phoenix Suns for whom he never played a game.

He holds Toronto Raptors franchise record for most blocks in one game with 12, set on 23 March 2001 in a game against the Atlanta Hawks.

In 2002, Clark posted averages of 11.3 points and 1.51 blocks per game, while also finishing ninth in the NBA in total personal fouls.

He holds career averages of 8.2 points, 5.9 rebounds and 1.62 blocks per game.

Personal life
Clark has been plagued by personal problems since leaving the NBA. In 2006, he was due to stand trial in Illinois on marijuana and weapons charges, but never showed up for trial. U.S. Marshals found him boarding a bus in Houston, Texas and brought him back to Danville for trial. He was sentenced to two and a half years in prison, but the sentence was thrown out because he did not have a lawyer at the time of sentencing. At a hearing, Clark admitted that he was a recovering alcoholic who had been drinking for most of the time since high school. He added that he "never played a game sober" during his NBA career, and usually drank during halftime. By his estimate, he drank half a pint to a pint of gin daily during his professional career.

On December 5, 2013 Clark was sentenced to eight years in prison for weapons charges but only served four. He was released from prison in July 2017, and currently lives in his hometown of Danville, Illinois.

See also
 List of National Basketball Association players with 10 or more blocks in a game

References

External links
 NBA.com Profile

1975 births
Living people
African-American basketball players
American expatriate basketball people in Canada
American men's basketball players
American sportspeople convicted of crimes
Basketball players from Illinois
Centers (basketball)
Denver Nuggets players
Utah Tech Trailblazers men's basketball players
Junior college men's basketball players in the United States
Orlando Magic draft picks
People from Danville, Illinois
Power forwards (basketball)
Sacramento Kings players
Toronto Raptors players
UNLV Runnin' Rebels basketball players
Utah Jazz players
21st-century African-American sportspeople
20th-century African-American sportspeople